The 2015 European Junior Cup was the fifth season of the European Junior Cup. It was contested over eight rounds, starting on 12 April at Motorland Aragón and ending on 4 October at Magny Cours. Starting in 2015 there was a "Women's European Cup" for female riders aged between 14 and 23 years. The upper age limit was also increased to 21 for males.

With five victories, Spanish rider Javier Orellana claimed the championship title with a round to spare, ultimately finishing fifty-six points clear of his next closest competitor, Paolo Grassia of Italy. Grassia prevailed in a three-rider contest for the runner-up position at the final round at Magny-Cours; his fifth-place finish saw him take the position by three points from France's Guillaume Raymond. Both riders finished on the podium three times, but did not claim a victory. Italian duo Emanuele Pusceddu and Giuseppe De Gruttola each won on home soil at Imola and Misano, while Spain's Xavi Pinsach won on a one-off appearance at Jerez.

Six wins from the eight races was enough for New Zealand's Avalon Biddle to win the Women's European Cup – again with a round to spare – by fifty-four points ahead of Anastassia Kovalenko. The only other rider to win was Hungarian rider Viktória Kis, who won back-to-back races at Assen and Imola.

Entry list

Race calendar and results

Championship standings

Riders' championship

Women's European Cup

References

External links
 

2015 in motorcycle sport
Junior